Go Yo-da (born 26 September 1969) is a South Korean boxer. He competed in the men's light heavyweight event at the 1992 Summer Olympics.

References

1969 births
Living people
South Korean male boxers
Olympic boxers of South Korea
Boxers at the 1992 Summer Olympics
Place of birth missing (living people)
Light-heavyweight boxers